"Life Serial" is the fifth episode in the 6th season of the television series Buffy the Vampire Slayer.

Plot
Buffy returns from her visit with Angel but refuses to talk about it. The Scoobies discuss Buffy's future. Buffy agrees to audit the classes Willow and Tara are taking until the next semester starts. Meanwhile, the Trio prepare for their competition to test Buffy, setting up their van with high-tech monitoring equipment.

At school, Buffy finds herself overwhelmed by a class she takes with Willow. Buffy later meets up with Tara for Art History, but before class begins Warren tags her with a tiny device that causes time to fast-forward. Buffy is dazed as the world whizzes around her; when she finally notices the device Warren planted on her, it self-destructs and puts Buffy back in normal time.

Buffy works with Xander at his construction job, telling him about the time situation at school before she is introduced to Tony, the boss. Andrew summons demons from the van, which trash the construction site before Buffy kills them. Unfortunately, Buffy knocks Tony unconscious and the construction men she saves refuse to admit they were saved by a girl. Xander gets mad at Buffy for bringing slaying to his workplace but understands that something is happening. However, he is still forced to fire her.

Buffy learns about working at The Magic Box from Giles and Anya as Jonathan begins a spell to loop time until Buffy satisfies a customer. Buffy assists a man with a candle sale and then goes downstairs to fetch a live mummy hand for a female customer, but the hand attacks her and she is forced to kill it, which also kills the sale. Events start to repeat as Buffy must help the customers and fight the mummy hand over and over again, being reduced to tears out of frustration. She is stuck in an unsolved dilemma, but soon Buffy is able to end the spell by telling the woman she will order the hand instead of going downstairs to fight with the one they already have. Stressed out by the repeating time and the job itself, Buffy walks out. All the while, the three villains keep scores on their Buffy attacks.

Later that night, Buffy gets drunk with Spike at his crypt where he plays poker (using kittens as currency) and searches for information. After the poker game ends badly, Buffy rants to Spike about the new low her life has reached with her inability to understand school or get a decent job. Buffy and Spike notice a black van; the Trio notices Buffy approaching with alarm.

Jonathan, disguised as a fake demon, appears from behind the van and threatens Buffy, but he is beaten down while the van drives away. With the use of smoke to confuse the slayer and vampire, Jonathan runs away and complains to Warren and Andrew who realize they now have much information on Buffy's fighting style that can be used against her. Buffy begins to recover from her drunken state and complains to Giles about her life. He consoles her and offers her a cheque to help pay for all the expenses. Buffy says she is happy that Giles will always be there, but the look on Giles's face suggests that he might not always be.

References

External links

 

Buffy the Vampire Slayer (season 6) episodes
2001 American television episodes
Television episodes written by Jane Espenson
Television episodes written by David Fury
Time loop television episodes